The 2002–03 Kazakhstan Hockey Championship was the 11th season of the Kazakhstan Hockey Championship, the top level of ice hockey in Kazakhstan. Seven teams participated in the league, and Kazzinc-Torpedo won the championship.

Standings

References
Kazakh Ice Hockey Federation

Kazakhstan Hockey Championship
Kazakhstan Hockey Championship seasons
Kaz